Self-Titled (stylised in parentheses) is the debut studio album by Marcus Mumford, released on 16 September 2022 via Island Records. The album features guest appearances by Phoebe Bridgers, Brandi Carlile, Clairo, and Monica Martin, in addition to being produced by Blake Mills.

Style and reception 

The Arts Desks Barney Harsent opens by quoting opening track "Cannibal": "I can still taste you and I hate it/That wasn't a choice in the mind of a child and you knew it/You took the first slice of me and you ate it raw/Ripped at it with your teeth and your lips like a cannibal/You fucking animal." About these lines, Harsent says they "are the first indication this might not be the album you've been expecting. Even if you're already aware of the childhood abuse the singer suffered, and which inspired this collection songs, prior knowledge does little to prepare you for the visceral punch those words pack." Harsent goes on to describe the "particularly affecting sense of linear narrative" of second song "Grace", about Mumford's conversation with his mother about the abuse, saying that unlike "Cannibal", "Grace" "bursts into life like Tom Petty gatecrashing a therapy session" and is "unexpectedly and defiantly upbeat, the sound of a weight being lifted." Harsent summarises the album as "unlikely to win over any new fans", though it "may force a few naysayers to admit he's got a decent set of pipes", but "Ultimately, it's an album about redefining oneself in spite of life's labels and, at a time when we're surrounded on all sides by performative, shrieking grief, it feels genuine: raw, open and honest." 

DIYs Emma Swann compares the album to Vegemite and Marmite, calling it "the same, but different", noting that "when [Mumford] strips it right back" such as on "Prior Warning", "Dangerous Game", and the beginning of "Cannibal", there's "a warm quality to his songwriting that seeps through." But after "Cannibal", when "everything crashes, kitchen sink and all, as if years of headlining arenas trigger a fear response if too long passes before the 'epic' is switched on", we end up with an album which is "just Marcus leaving the kids at home for an evening, only to do the same exact thing just without a chorus of 'are we there yet', 'I'm bored', and 'well, actually...'"

NMEs Elizabeth Aubrey notes "Only Child" as "skeletally acoustic" and "resembl[ing] a devastating Paul McCartney ballad in both sound and structure", while "Prior Warning" depicts Mumford's spiral into "alcoholism and a dangerous cycle of self-medication" with "solitary strings" and "Better Off High" tells of an intervention staged by his family "as recounted on the album's most unsettling and experimental track". Aubrey also highlights Blake Mills's production as "exquisite throughout". 

Pitchforks Stephen Thomas Erlewine calls the album "confounding", writing that "its strongest qualities as a record occasionally contradict the emotional thrust of the songs. Mills' production gives the recordings dimension and depth, inevitably tempering the pain at the heart of the songs." And while the "sumptuous, cinematic ... almost soothing" sound is "more appealing than the buttoned-up folk of Mumford & Sons, it also undercuts the rawer journey that (self-titled) could have been." The Telegraphs Neil McCormick notes that "while the sound sometimes swells to an epic rush that pushes Mumford up to the top of his register, the tone of Self-Titled is more intimate than anything in his catalogue so far", with some songs "verg[ing] towards underpowered" and not "achiev[ing] transcendence", but "when it lands a blow, you know that you've been hit."

Year-end lists

Track listing
All tracks are written by Marcus Mumford and Blake Mills and produced by Mills, except where noted.

Personnel
Musicians

 Marcus Mumford – vocals (all tracks), acoustic guitar (1, 4, 6–10), drums (1, 4, 7, 8), electric guitar (1–3, 6, 7), percussion (2, 4, 6–8), bass guitar (3), guitarrón (3), synth bass (3), piano (4), Wurlitzer electronic piano (9)
 Blake Mills – acoustic guitar (1, 2, 4–9), drums (1, 8), electric guitar (1, 2, 4, 6–9), organ (1, 3), percussion (1–8), synthesizer (1, 6, 7, 9), harmonium (2), piano (2, 4, 5, 10), synth bass (2, 4), vocals (2, 7), drum programming (4), celesta (5), bass guitar (6–8), 12-string acoustic guitar (8)
 Jim Keltner – cymbals (1), drums (6, 9), percussion (6)
 Joseph Lorge – baritone guitar (2), electric guitar (10)
 Pino Palladino – bass guitar (2)
 Steve Ferrone – drums (2)
 Reuben James – organ (2), synthesizer (8)
 Rob Moose – strings (2, 6, 9, 10)
 Danielle Ponder – vocals (2)
 Gavin Batty – vocals (2)
 Abe Rounds – tambourine (4)
 Muskers – vocals (5)
 Clairo – vocals (6)
 Lemar Carter – drums (8)
 Monica Martin – vocals (8)
 Bryan Stevenson – piano (9)
 Phoebe Bridgers – vocals (9)
 Hideaki Aomori – clarinet (10)
 Aaron Embry – piano (10)
 Brandi Carlile – vocals (10)

Technical
 Patricia Sullivan – mastering
 Blake Mills – mixing
 Joseph Lorge – mixing, engineering
 Brandon Bost – engineering (3), additional engineering (7, 8)
 Danielle Goldsmith – engineering assistance
 Gabe Lowry – engineering assistance
 Logan Taylor – engineering assistance
 Scott Moore – engineering assistance
 Brian Rajaratnam – engineering assistance
 Hotae Alexander Jang – engineering assistance

Visual
 Todd Tourso – creative direction, package design
 James Marcus Haney – photography
 Robin Harper – photography

Charts

References

2022 debut albums
Albums produced by Blake Mills
Island Records albums
Marcus Mumford albums